The 2020–21 Ohio University Bobcats men's basketball team represented Ohio University for the 2020–21 NCAA Division I men's basketball season. The Bobcats were led by second-year head coach Jeff Boals, who was a 1995 graduate of Ohio University. The team played their home games at the Convocation Center in Athens, Ohio as a member of the Mid-American Conference. In  a season limited due to the ongoing COVID-19 pandemic, they finished the season 17–8, 9–5 in MAC play to finish in fifth place. As the No. 5 seed in the MAC tournament, they defeated Kent State, Toledo, and Buffalo to win the tournament championship. A a result, they received the conference's automatic bid to the NCAA tournament as the No. 13 seed in the West region. There they upset No. 4-seeded Virginia in the First Round before falling to No. 5-seeded Creighton in the Second Round.

Previous season

The Bobcats finished the 2019–20 season 17–15, 8–10 in MAC play to finish in last place in the East division. As the No. 8 seed in the MAC tournament, they defeated Central Michigan in the first round before the tournament was canceled due to the COVID-19 pandemic.

Offseason

Coaching Staff Changes

Coaching Departures

Coaching Additions

Departures

Incoming transfers

Recruiting class

Roster

Support Staff

Preseason
Prior to the season Ohio was picked second in the MAC preseason poll.  Jason Preston was named to the preseason first team all-conference while Ben Vander Plas was on the second team.

Preseason rankings

MAC Tournament Champions: Bowling Green (4), Akron (2), Ball State (1), Buffalo (1), Eastern Michigan (1), Kent State (1), Miami (1), Toledo (1)

Source

Preseason All-MAC 

Source

Schedule and results

Ohio had to cancel their games against Mississippi Valley State, Bowling Green, and Kent State due to COVID-19. They also postponed games against Miami (OH), Ball State, Eastern Michigan, Akron, Western Michigan, and Central Michigan.

|-
!colspan=9 style=| Non-conference regular season

|-
!colspan=9 style=| MAC regular season

|-
!colspan=9 style=| MAC Tournament

|-
!colspan=9 style=| NCAA tournament

Source

Statistics

Team Statistics
Final 2020–21 Statistics

Source

Player statistics

Source

Awards and honors

Weekly Awards

Final awards watchlists

All-MAC Awards 

Source

National Awards

References

Ohio Bobcats men's basketball seasons
Ohio
Ohio